Rehia is a genus of plants in the grass family. The only known species is Rehia nervata, native to Brazil (Amapá, Pará, Maranhão) and to the Guianas (Suriname, Guyana, French Guiana).

The genus name of Rehia is in honour of Richard Eric Holttum (1895–1990), who was an English botanist and author.

References

Bambusoideae genera
Grasses of South America
Grasses of Brazil
Monotypic Poaceae genera
Bambusoideae